Just Once a Great Lady is a 1934 German comedy film directed by Gerhard Lamprecht and starring Käthe von Nagy, Wolf Albach-Retty and Gretl Theimer.  Nagy plays a car saleswoman. The film's sets were designed by the art directors Otto Erdmann and Hans Sohnle. A separate French-language version A Day Will Come (1934) was also released, with Nagy reprising her role alongside Jean-Pierre Aumont.

In 1957 the film title was used for a West German remake of the 1932 film The Countess of Monte Cristo.

Cast

References

Bibliography

External links 
 

1934 films
German comedy films
1934 comedy films
1930s German-language films
Films directed by Gerhard Lamprecht
Films of Nazi Germany
Films about con artists
German multilingual films
Operetta films
UFA GmbH films
German black-and-white films
1934 multilingual films
1930s German films